Simple 4-line rhymes are usually characterized by having a simple rhyme scheme of ABCB repeated throughout the entire poem. Though usually simplistic looking, the songs can be very complex and are widely used today in most poetry and songs.

Many poets and authors use this pattern, including popular children's poets Bruce Larkin and Kenn Nesbitt.

Sonnet studies
Rhyme
Stanzaic form
Poetic forms